The 2015 Shanghai International Film Festival was the 18th such festival devoted to international cinema held in Shanghai, China. The opening film was I Am Somebody, written and directed by Derek Yee.

International Jury
The members of the jury for the Golden Goblet Award were:

 Andrey Zvyagintsev (Russian film director and actor; president of the jury)

Winners

Golden Goblet Awards
 Best Feature Film: The Night Watchman 
 Jury Grand Prix: Carte Blanche 
 Best Director: Cao Baoping for The Dead End
 Best Actor: Deng Chao, Duan Yihong and Guo Tao for The Dead End
 Best Actress: Krista Kosonen for Wildeye 
 Best Screenplay: Cake 
 Best Cinematography: Sunstroke  
 Best Music:
 Best Documentary: The Verse of Us 
 Best Animated Film: Song of the Sea 
 Outstanding Film Artistic Contribution: Oh Seung-wook for The Shameless

Asian New Talent Award
 Best Film: 13
 Best Director: Momoko Andō for 0.5 mm 
 Best Scriptwriter: Siti
 Best Actor: Huang Yuan for (Sex) Appeal 
 Best Actress: Yangchan Lhamo for River
 Best Cinematography: 13

China Movie Channel Media Award
 Best Director: Xu Ang for 12 Citizens 
 Best Scriptwriter: 12 Citizens 
 Best Actor: He Bing for 12 Citizens
 Best Actress: Yang Zishan for 20 Once Again
 Best Supporting Actor: Han Tongsheng for 12 Citizens
 Best Supporting Actress: Chen Jin for Nezha 
 Best New Director: Da Peng for Jian Bing Man
 Best New Actor: Da Peng for Jian Bing Man 
 Best New Actress: Li Haofei  for Nezha
 Special Jury Award: Wolf Warriors, Crazy New Year's Eve

Others
Lifetime Achievement Award: Xia Meng

References

External links
Official website

Shanghai International Film Festival
Shanghai International Film Festival
Shanghai
Shanghai
21st century in Shanghai